ALTIUS (Atmospheric Limb Tracker for Investigation of the Upcoming Stratosphere) is a satellite mission proposed  by the Belgian Institute for Space Aeronomy and currently under development by the European Space Agency. Its main objective is to monitor the distribution and evolution of stratospheric ozone in the Earth's atmosphere. The industrial consortium is led by QinetiQ Space, acting as mission prime. The satellite design is based on the PROBA small satellite bus. The payload, developed by OIP Sensor Systems, is an innovative UV, visible and NIR instrument.

The mission is scheduled for launch in 2025 from the Guiana Space Centre.

See also
List of European Space Agency programs and missions
PROBA

External links

References

Earth observation satellites of the European Space Agency
Proposed satellites
2025 in spaceflight